WMNH-LP (95.3 FM, "WMNH-LP 95.3 FM") is a radio station licensed to serve the community of Manchester, New Hampshire. The station is owned by Manchester Public Television Service and airs a variety format.

The station was assigned the WMNH-LP call letters by the Federal Communications Commission on October 21, 2014.

References

External links
 Official Website
 FCC Public Inspection File for WMNH-LP
 

MNH-LP
MNH-LP
Radio stations established in 2015
2015 establishments in New Hampshire
Variety radio stations in the United States
Hillsborough County, New Hampshire